Aditi Sajwan is an Indian television actress. Aditi made her debut in Zee Tv's Meri Doli Tere Angana . Later, she entered Imagine TV's Raajkumar Aaryyan to play the role of Mayasheen. She played Yashoda in Jai Shri Krishna and was seen in and as Meera. She has also acted in shows like Hamari Saass Leela, Piya Ka Ghar Pyaara Lage and Chidiya Ghar.

Filmography

Television

References

External links

Living people
Indian television actresses
Indian soap opera actresses
Actresses from Dehradun
Actresses in Hindi television
21st-century Indian actresses
Year of birth missing (living people)